Ivor Edward David (6 April 1875 - 23 November 1913) was the seventh British colonial Inspector-General of Police in Ceylon (1910-1913).

Ivor Edward David was born 6 April 1875 in Llandaff, Glamorgan, Wales.

David joined the Indian Police Service having passed the Civil Service Examination, where he served in Mysore, Bangalore and Madras.
 
In 1910 when Cyril Longden's contract as Inspector-General of Police of Ceylon expired the Colonial government first considered appointing Herbert Dowbiggin but he was determined as being too young for the position. The government instead choose to appoint David, the District Superintendent of Police in Madras, as the new Inspector-General of Police in Ceylon.

During his tenure David is noted for establishing the Police sports grounds in Bambalapitiya in 1912.
David died unexpectedly on 23 November 1913 in Colombo, Ceylon at the age of 38. His position as Inspector-General of Police was filled by Dowbiggin.

References

1875 births
1913 deaths
British colonial police officers
Sri Lankan Inspectors General of Police
British people in British Ceylon
Indian Police Service officers in British India
British people in colonial India